The following is a list of county routes in Monmouth County in the U.S. state of New Jersey.  For more information on the county route system in New Jersey as a whole, including its history, see County routes in New Jersey.

History
In the 1937 renumbering of Monmouth County roads, numbers 1 through 5 were reserved for the longer, "cross-county" routes; those numbered 6 and above were to be more local in nature. County Route 1 was designated to run from the Mercer County line via Freehold and Eatontown to the Long Branch city limits. With the establishment of the 500 Series of county routes, CR 1 was superseded by CR 524 from the Mercer County line to Smithburg, and CR 537 from Smithburg to the Long Branch boundary.
The present CR 1 was formed when part of CR 3 was separated from the balance of CR 3 with the 1952 establishment of CR 527 as part of the 500 Series routes. Since the CR 1 designation was available, that portion of CR 3 between CR 527 and CR 571 was re-designated as County Route 1.

500-series county routes
In addition to those listed below, the following 500-series county routes serve Monmouth County:
CR 516, CR 516 Spur, CR 520, CR 522, CR 524, CR 524A, CR 524 Spur, CR 526, CR 526 Spur, CR 527, CR 527A, CR 537, CR 539, CR 547, CR 549, CR 571

Other county routes

See also

References

The Monmouth County Scenic Roadway Plan, Monmouth County Planning Board, September 17, 2001

External links

New Jersey Roads - Route Log - Monmouth Log

 
Monmouth